This page lists the albums that reached number-one on the overall Top R&B/Hip-Hop Albums chart, the R&B Albums chart (which was re-created in 2013), and the Rap Albums chart in 2019. The R&B Albums and Rap Albums charts partly serve as distillations of the overall R&B/Hip-Hop Albums chart.

List of number ones

See also
2019 in music
List of Billboard 200 number-one albums of 2019
List of number-one R&B/hip-hop songs of 2019 (U.S.)

References

2019
2019
United States RandB Hip Hop Albums